Urheiluruutu is a daily sports magazine produced and broadcast by Finnish Broadcasting Company Yle. 

The programme originally launched on August 18, 1962. The sportsreader was Anssi Kukkonen and the programme was gathered up by Seppo Kannas. Kukkonen is also the father of the name Urheiluruutu ("sports screen") which was inspired by Swedish Sportspegeln. Before Urheiluruutu the sports news was read in the end of normal news broadcast. In the beginning Urheiluruutu was broadcast only once in a week: 15 minutes at Sunday evenings. Later it was broadcast also on Thursdays and Saturdays. In 1993 the daily broadcasting began.

The audiovisual appearance of Urheiluruutu has changed many times during the years, previously in February 2013. The first opening sequence from 1963 included an animated rooster, originating from a pun of Anssi Kukkonen's name ("kukko" being the Finnish word for rooster). The most well-known theme music is the Leevi and the Leavings song Tuhannen markan seteli, used from 1983 to 1993.

Nowadays the broadcasting times of Urheiluruutu are 7:16 p.m. in YLE TV2 and 8:55 p.m. in YLE TV1 (the main broadcast). Also a short sports segment is included after the 9:50 p.m. news bulletin in YLE TV2, often clashing with the beginning of rival station MTV3's Ten O'Clock News.

Sportreaders

Current
 Laura Arffman
 Antti Ennekari
 Inka Henelius
 Maija Kautto
 Kristiina Kekäläinen
 Manu Myllyaho
 Petra Manner
 Jere Nurminen
 Antti-Jussi Sipilä
 Riikka Smolander
 Riku Salminen
 Tapio Suominen

Former
 Hannu-Pekka Hänninen
 Inka Henelius
 Juha Jokinen
 Niki Juusela
 Ville Klinga
 Anssi Kukkonen
 Riku Riihilahti
 Pentti Salmi
 Laura Ruohola
 Marko Terva-aho
 Bror-Erik Wallenius

Sports mass media in Finland
Finnish television shows
1962 Finnish television series debuts
Yle original programming